On 16 October 2018, a passenger train derailed near Bouknadel in Morocco, killing at least 7 and injuring at least 125.

Accident 
At 9:20 local time (UTC+1), ONCF regional train service number 9 went off rails and the locomotive hit a bridge near the location of the derailment.

Victims 
Shortly after the accident, 7 victims were announced to be immediately killed and at least 80 were injured.

Investigation 
Some hours after the accident, a royal palace communiqué announced that an investigation on the cause of the accident was opened.

Reactions 
After the train accident, many Moroccans expressed their rage towards the national operator ONCF and an online campaign with the hashtag #Baraka meaning enough was launched to boycott the operator's services.

References 

2018 in Morocco
Derailments in Morocco
October 2018 events in Africa
Railway accidents in 2018
Rabat-Salé-Kénitra
2018 disasters in Morocco